Pancho Casal (born Francisco Casal Vidal, 16 August 1955) is a Spanish engineer, film producer and politician.

Biography 
Pancho Casal was born in 1955 in A Coruña.He studied at Comillas Pontifical University and graduated at the age of 21 in 1977, as a senior engineer in the branch of Electronics. in 1978, he got the title of superior industrial engineer. After graduating, he worked as an engineer and media producer. He was the technical director of several companies and maintenance manager of Unión Fenosa's hydraulic power plants.

Cinema career 
He also works in the field of cinema. casal has produced several films and television shows. He has also worked as an executive producer. He was nominated for the Goya Award in 2011 and 2015.

Selected filmography 
 Continental (executive producer)1989
 A familia Pita (TV Series) (1996) producer 
 Frontera Sur (1998) co-producer
 Finisterre, donde termina el mundo (1998) producer
 By My Side Again (1999) associate producer
 La rosa de piedra (1999) executive producer
 I Know Who You Are (2000) producer
 The Impatient Alchemist (2002) producer
 Thirteen Chimes (2002) executive producer
 Al alcance de su mano (TV Movie) (2002) executive producer
 Joc de mentides (TV Movie) (2003) co-producer
 Aguiño, sobrevivr al prestige (Documentary) (2003) executive producer
 Your Next Life (2004) producer
 Para que no me olvides (2005) producer  
 Un rey en La Habana (2005) co-producer
 Los aires difíciles (2006) producer
 Blue Days (2006) producer
 De profundis (2007) producer
 The Contestant (2007) producer
 Abrígate (2007) producer
 Una mujer invisible (2007) producer
 A Flor máis grande do mundo (Short) (2007) producer
 O gran camiño (TV Series) (2007)producer
 Animal Crisis (2007) producer
 Os Atlánticos (TV Series) (2008) producer
 Altra oportunitat (TV Series) (2008) executive producer / producer
 El espejo'' (TV Movie) (2008) producer

References 

1955 births
Comillas Pontifical University alumni
Members of the 10th Parliament of Galicia
Living people
Spanish film producers